Milva is Italian singer, actress, and television personality Maria Ilva Biolcati (1939–2021).

Milva may also refer to:

 Milva Ekonomi (born 1962), Albanian politician and government minister
 Milva Perinoni (born 1961), birth name of Eva Grimaldi, Italian actress and model
 Michaela Kalogerakou (born 1998), Greek water polo player nicknamed "Milva"
 Milva, a character in The Witcher fantasy series

Feminine given names